An election of Members of the European Parliament representing Hungary constituency was held in 2004 for the 2004–09 term of the European Parliament. It was part of the wider 2004 European election.

The vote took place on 13 June. The ruling Hungarian Socialist Party was heavily defeated by the opposition conservative Hungarian Civic Union and other conservative parties.

Results

By county

References

Hungary
European Parliament elections in Hungary
European